David Jeffrey Kravish (born September 12, 1992) is an American-Bulgarian professional basketball player for Unicaja of the Liga ACB. He played college basketball for California.

He has received Bulgarian citizenship and represents the Bulgarian national team.

College career
Kravish played for seasons with the California Golden Bears. He became a starter for the team during his freshman season, appearing in all 34 of California's games with 24 starts and averaging 6.9 points and 5.6 rebounds per game while leading the team with 41 blocked shots (1.2 per game). Kravish was named to the Pac-12 Conference All-Freshman Team. As a sophomore, he averaged 7.9 points, 6.9 rebounds and 1.7 blocks per game. In his junior season, Kravish averaged 11.4 points, 7.7 rebounds and 2.1 blocks per game and set a school record with 73 blocked shots which has since passed by Kingsley Okoroh. He averaged 11.3 points, 7.0 rebounds and 1.5 blocks per game as a senior.

Professional career

Nokia
Kravish began his professional career playing for BC Nokia in the Finnish Korisliiga, where he averaged 13.7 points and 7.7 rebounds per game in 47 games as the team finished in third place.

Słupsk
Kravish signed with Czarni Słupsk of the Polish Basketball League (PLK) on July 31, 2016. In 41 games, Kravish averaged 12.9 points, 8.0 rebounds, 1.1 assists and 1.3 blocks per game.

Minsk
Kravish signed with the Belarusan club BC Tsmoki-Minsk of the VTB United League. He averaged 12.1 points, 7.5 rebounds, 1.3 assists and 1.3 blocks per game in VTB United League play. He also averaged 10.3 points, 7.2 rebounds, 1.6 assists and 1.5 blocks in 14 FIBA Europe Cup games and 9.7 points and 8.7 rebounds in six Champions League games.

Avtodor
Kravish remained in the United League for a second season, signing with the Russian club BC Avtodor on June 21, 2018. He averaged 12.3 points, 7.9 rebounds, 1.2 assists and 1.1 block in United League play and was twice named the player of the week. In 13 Europe Cup games Kravish averaged 10.2 points per game and 7.8 rebounds per game, highest in the competition.

Manresa
Kravish signed with Baxi Manresa of the Liga ACB on August 4, 2019. He averaged 11.5 points and 6.1 rebounds per game.

Brose Bamberg
On August 4, 2020, Kravish signed with Brose Bamberg of the German Basketball Bundesliga (BBL).

Galatasaray
On August 12, 2021, Kravish signed with Galatasaray Nef of the Turkish Basketball Super League (BSL).

Unicaja
On June 23, 2022, he has signed with Unicaja of the Liga ACB.

National team career

References

External links
David Kravish at acb.com 
California Golden Bears bio
RealGM profile
TBLStat.net Profile

1992 births
Living people
American expatriate basketball people in Belarus
American expatriate basketball people in Finland
American expatriate basketball people in Germany
American expatriate basketball people in Poland
American expatriate basketball people in Russia
American expatriate basketball people in Spain
American expatriate basketball people in Turkey
American men's basketball players
Basketball players from Missouri
Bàsquet Manresa players
BC Avtodor Saratov players
BC Nokia players
BC Tsmoki-Minsk players
Brose Bamberg players
California Golden Bears men's basketball players
Czarni Słupsk players
Galatasaray S.K. (men's basketball) players
Liga ACB players
Power forwards (basketball)
People from Lee's Summit, Missouri
Sportspeople from the Kansas City metropolitan area